Billaea is a genus of tachinid flies in the family Tachinidae. Most larvae, where known are parasitoids of Coleoptera (Cerambycidae, Lucanidae) or Lepidoptera (Pyralidae)

Species

Billaea adelpha (Loew, 1873)
Billaea atkinsoni (Baranov 1934)
Billaea biserialis (Portshinsky, 1881)
Billaea claripalpis (Wulp, 1895)
Billaea fortis (Rondani, 1862)
Billaea intermedia (Portshinsky, 1881)
Billaea interrupta (Curran, 1929)
Billaea irrorata (Meigen, 1826)
Billaea kolomyetzi Mesnil, 1970
Billaea lata (Macquart, 1849)
Billaea maritima (Schiner, 1862)
Billaea marmorata (Meigen, 1838)
Billaea monohammi (Townsend, 1912)
Billaea montana (West, 1924)
Billaea morosa Mesnil, 1963
Billaea nipigonensis Curran, 1926
Billaea pectinata (Meigen, 1826)
Billaea quadrinota Kolomiets, 1966
Billaea rutilans (Fabricius, 1781)
Billaea satisfacta (West, 1925)
Billaea sibleyi (West, 1925)
Billaea steini (Brauer & von Bergenstamm, 1891)
Billaea triangulifera (Zetterstedt, 1844)
Billaea trivittata (1929)

References

Tachinidae genera
Dexiinae
Taxa named by Jean-Baptiste Robineau-Desvoidy